Wu-Tang Clan: Of Mics and Men is a four-episode American documentary television series that premiered on Showtime on May 10, 2019. The documentary was created by Sacha Jenkins and tells a story of the New York-based hip-hop group Wu-Tang Clan from their earliest times to commemorate the 25th anniversary of the group.

The four sixty-minute episodes, all nine living members of the group are interviewed, as well as footage from 2004 featuring the late Ol' Dirty Bastard are shown. Numerous people affiliated with the Wu-Tang Clan also contributed to it providing their own stories and describing their relations with the members.

The title is a wordplay based on John Steinbeck's literary classic, Of Mice and Men.

On May 17, 2019, an EP, which also is the soundtrack of the documentary, Wu-Tang: Of Mics and Men was released on Spotify.

Wu-Tang: Of Mics and Men EP 
A week after the documentary premiere, 36 Chambers Records along with Mass Appeal released a seven-track EP entitled Wu-Tang: Of Mics and Men. The EP contains verses from several Wu-Tang Clan members, including RZA, Ghostface Killah, Cappadonna, Raekwon and Masta Killa. Three of the tracks are skits which contains interview excerpts from Nas, GZA, Masta Killa and Cheo Hodari Coker.

Track listing

References

2010s American documentary television series
2019 American television series debuts
2019 American television series endings
2019 EPs
Albums produced by DJ Scratch
Albums produced by Mathematics
Albums produced by RZA
Documentary films about hip hop music and musicians
English-language television shows
Showtime (TV network) original programming
Wu-Tang Clan
Wu-Tang Clan albums